Cato is the surname of:

 Beth Cato (born 1980), American speculative fiction writer and poet
 Bette Cato (1924–1996), American politician
 Bob Cato (1923–1999), American photographer and graphic designer, two-time Grammy Award winner for album covers
 Connie Cato (born 1955), American country music singer
 Cordell Cato (born 1992), Trinidadian footballer
 Daryl Cato (1920–1970), American National Football League player
 Diomedes Cato (1560 to 1565–1618), Italian-born Polish composer
 George Christopher Cato (1814–?), first mayor of Durban, South Africa
 Harry Cato (born 1958), American politician
 John Cato (1926–2011), Australian fine art photographer and teacher
 Kelvin Cato (born 1974), American basketball player
 Lennox Cato (born 1961), British antiques dealer, one of the experts on the British television series Antiques Roadshow
 Leo Cato, Speaker of the House of Representatives of Grenada since 2022
 Louis Cato (born 1985), American musician, bandleader of The Late Show Band
 Lurine Cato, British gospel singer and songwriter
 Milton Cato (1915–1997), first Prime Minister of Saint Vincent and the Grenadines
 Minto Cato (1900–1979), African-American singer and operatic mezzo-soprano
 Molly Scott Cato (born 1963), British politician and economist
 Nancy Cato (1917–2000), Australian writer
 Noah Cato (born 1988), English rugby union player
 Rakeem Cato (born 1992), American football player
 Roland Cato (born 1997), Grenadian cricketer
 Sam Cato (born 1992), English former first-class cricketer
 Suzy Cato (born 1968), New Zealand entertainer